Jeffrey Maxwell Cohen (October 12, 1939 – June 23, 1978) was an All-American basketball player at the College of William & Mary in 1960–61. He was selected as the 14th pick in the second round (23rd overall) of the 1961 NBA Draft by the Chicago Packers (now the Washington Wizards).

At William & Mary, Cohen played his way into the NCAA record books. He is the ninth all-time leading rebounder in the pre-1973 college basketball era, having grabbed 1,679 boards. He is one of very few men's basketball players in NCAA history to score 2,000 points and grab 1,000 rebounds during a collegiate career. At the time of his graduation, he was only one of 10 players to ever accomplish that feat. As of 2019–20, Cohen's 2,003 career points rank fourth all-time at William & Mary. He was a three-time All-Southern Conference selection from 1959 to 1961, and in 1990 he had his jersey number retired posthumously. Additionally, Jeff set a W&M single game scoring record of 49 points on February 25, 1961. He was a member of the Sigma Nu fraternity.

Despite being drafted to the NBA, Jeff was never signed by any team. He spent some time playing professionally in the now-defunct American Basketball League from 1961 to 1963. As a member of the Hawaii Chiefs, he averaged 10.8 points, 6.6 rebounds and 0.6 assists per game for the 1961–62 season. The following season, Cohen averaged 12.5 points, 8.0 rebounds and 1.2 assists while playing for the Chicago Majors.

See also
 List of NCAA Division I men's basketball players with 2,000 points and 1,000 rebounds
 List of NCAA Division I men's basketball career rebounding leaders
List of select Jewish basketball players

References

1939 births
1978 deaths
American men's basketball players
Basketball players from Wisconsin
Chicago Majors players
Chicago Packers draft picks
Deaths from cancer in Switzerland
Hawaii Chiefs (basketball) players
Jewish American sportspeople
Jewish men's basketball players
Mary D. Bradford High School alumni
People from Rheinfelden District
Power forwards (basketball)
Sportspeople from the Chicago metropolitan area
Sportspeople from Kenosha, Wisconsin
William & Mary Tribe men's basketball players